Miroslav Čabrilo (born 6 June 1992) is a Serbian soccer player currently playing with BGH City in the Canadian Soccer League.

Career

College and Amateur
Čabrilo played fours years of college soccer at Robert Morris University between 2010 and 2013. During his college years Čabrilo also played with Ottawa Fury and Hamilton Rage.

Professional
Čabrilo signed his first professional contract with USL Pro club Pittsburgh Riverhounds on 12 May 2014. He finished his first season with the club with two goals in 15 appearances. In 2016, he signed with Hamilton City SC in the Canadian Soccer League. The next season he signed with Brantford Galaxy, where he appeared in 13 matches and recorded six goals. In 2018, he was transferred to Hamilton after the organization returned for the 2018 season. 

After the merger between Hamilton with Brantford Galaxy he played with BGH City for the 2021 season.

References

1992 births
Living people
Sportspeople from Nevesinje
Serbs of Bosnia and Herzegovina
Canadian soccer players
Canadian expatriate soccer players
Robert Morris Colonials men's soccer players
Ottawa Fury (2005–2013) players
K-W United FC players
Pittsburgh Riverhounds SC players
Hamilton City SC players
Brantford Galaxy players
Expatriate soccer players in the United States
USL League Two players
USL Championship players
Canadian Soccer League (1998–present) players
Association football forwards 
Association football midfielders